Dmitri Anatolyevich Zakharenkov (6 June 1978 – 23 August 2017) was a Russian professional football player.

Club career
He played 3 seasons in the Russian Football National League for FC Chita.

Honours
 Russian Second Division Zone East top scorer: 2006 (22 goals).

References

1978 births
2017 deaths
Road incident deaths in Russia
Russian footballers
Association football forwards
FC Chayka Peschanokopskoye players
FC Chita players
FC Amur Blagoveshchensk players
People from Novocherkassk
Sportspeople from Rostov Oblast